The International Journal of Mathematics and Computer Science (online: ,) is a quarterly peer-reviewed scientific journal which was established in 2006 and publishes original papers in the broad subjects of mathematics and computer science. It is abstracted and indexed by Clarivate Analytics (Thomson Reuters previously), Scopus, Zentralblatt Math, and Mathematical Reviews. The editor-in-chief is Professor Badih Ghusayni.

External links 
 

Mathematics journals
Publications established in 2006
English-language journals